Richard Whiting may refer to:

 Richard Whiting (abbot) (1461–1539), last Abbot of Glastonbury Abbey before the Dissolution of the Monasteries
 Richard A. Whiting (1891–1938), writer of popular songs, father of singer Margaret Whiting and actress Barbara Whiting Smith
 Richard H. Whiting (1826–1888), U.S. Representative from Illinois
 Richard Whiting (rugby league) (born 1984), English rugby league player